Joey Aresco (born August 22, 1949) is an American film and television actor. He is known for playing the role of Sgt. John David Hutchinson in the first season of the American television series Baa Baa Black Sheep.

Early life and education 
Aresco was born in Brooklyn, New York, and raised in California. He attended Pierce College and initially intended to become an attorney. He then attended the University of California in Santa Barbara, California, where he took a drama class and decided to become an actor.

Career 
Aresco made his screen debut in 1973 in the television crime drama series Chase.

Aresco has guest-starred in television programs including Dynasty, Barney Miller, Remington Steele, Baretta, Lou Grant, Kolchak: The Night Stalker, Taxi, Trapper John, M.D., Star Trek: The Next Generation, Cannon, Hill Street Blues, Night Court, The Streets of San Francisco, Jake and the Fatman, Kojak, Murder, She Wrote, St. Elsewhere, and The Rockford Files. He also played the recurring role of Boomer in five episodes of the television soap opera Dallas. In 1976, Aresco played the role of the mechanic Sgt. John David Hutchinson in the television series Baa Baa Black Sheep. 

In 1979, Aresco played the role of the young operating officer "Wayne Randall" in the adventure and drama television series Supertrain. In 1984, Aresco joined the cast of the soap opera television series Capitol. He has also appeared in a number of films including Swing Shift, The Big Year and Blonde and Blonder.

Filmography

Film

Television

References

External links 

Rotten Tomatoes profile

1949 births
Living people
People from Brooklyn
Male actors from New York (state)
American male film actors
American male soap opera actors
American male television actors
20th-century American male actors
21st-century American male actors
Pierce College people
University of California, Santa Barbara alumni